Francis Conlan (4 July 1883 – 28 February 1953) was an Irish Gaelic footballer who played as a left corner-forward for the Kildare senior team. 

Regarded as one of Kildare's greatest-ever players, Conlan made his first appearance for the team during the 1903 championship and was a regular member of the starting fifteen until his retirement after the 1921 championship. During that time he won two All-Ireland medals and three Leinster medals. Conlan was an All-Ireland runner-up on one occasion.

At club level Conlan enjoyed a hugely successful career with Roseberry, winning nine county club championship medals.

References

1883 births
1953 deaths
Roseberry Gaelic footballers
Kildare inter-county Gaelic footballers
Winners of two All-Ireland medals (Gaelic football)